Justice Stevens (John Paul Stevens, 1920–2019) was an associate justice of the Supreme Court of the United States.

Justice Stevens may also refer to:

Correale Stevens (born 1946), associate justice of the Supreme Court of Pennsylvania
E. Ray Stevens (1869–1930), associate justice of the Wisconsin Supreme Court
Harold A. Stevens (1907–1990), judge of the New York Court of Appeals
Stephen Stevens (1793–1870), associate justice of the Supreme Court of Indiana
Truman S. Stevens (1867–1950), associate justice of the Iowa Supreme Court

See also
Judge Stevens (disambiguation)
Justice Stephens (disambiguation)